The Serra Negra River is a river of Paraná state in southern Brazil.

At its mouth the river flows through a flat region of unconsolidated sediment of continental and marine origins, where it joins the Tagaçaba River to form the Benito creek.
The creek lies in the Guaraqueçaba Ecological Station, which protects the mangroves.

See also
List of rivers of Paraná

References

Brazilian Ministry of Transport

Rivers of Paraná (state)